Chodów may refer to the following places:
Chodów, Lesser Poland Voivodeship (south Poland)
Chodów, Łódź Voivodeship (central Poland)
Chodów, Masovian Voivodeship (east-central Poland)
Chodów, Greater Poland Voivodeship (west-central Poland)